is a mountain peak in the Black Cuillin range on the Isle of Skye, Scotland. Like the rest of the range it is composed of gabbro, a rock with excellent grip for mountaineering.

The simplest route ascends via the col of An Dorus (the Door), most easily reached from Glen Brittle. The mountain has four summits; only the highest can be reached by scramblers. The three lower summits require rock-climbing skills and equipment.

References

Munros
Mountains and hills of the Isle of Skye